Forever is the fifth album by Orleans, released in 1979 on Infinity Records. It is the first album without John Hall.

Record World called the title track a "pretty love song" that "opens with a soft acoustic guitar and touching vocal that build in drama and intensity via a soaring
electric lead bridge."

Cash Box said of the single "Don't Throw Our Love Away" that it is a smart, rock-tinged pop song, with some neat lead and slide guitar work."

Track listing

Personnel
Orleans
Larry Hoppen - guitar, lead and backing vocals, trumpet
Lance Hoppen - bass, backing vocals
Bob Leinbach - keyboards, lead and backing vocals, trombone
Wells Kelly - drums, backing vocals, percussion
Robert Martin - keyboards, lead and backing vocals, saxophone, conductor

Additional musicians
The Leanhorns - horns (3, 5)
Maurice Bialkin - cello (4)
David Sackson - viola (4)
Joe Malin - violin (4)
Peter Buonconsiglio - violin (4)

Production
Producer: Roy Cicala, Orleans
Engineers: Roy Cicala, Sam Ginsberg
Photography: Elliott Landy, Alen MacWeeney

Charts
Album

Singles

References

1979 albums
Orleans (band) albums